Kohlawas is a village located in the Charkhi Dadri district, in the northern state of Haryana, India.

References

Villages in Charkhi Dadri district